Myurellopsis columellaris is a species of sea snail, a marine gastropod mollusc in the family Terebridae, the auger snails.

Description
The length of the shell varies between 20 mm and 53 mm.

(Original description) The subulate shell has a pale flesh colour. It is polished and shining. It contains 15 whorls. These are sculptured with closely set longitudinal costae, crossed near the upper end by a slight spiral groove, thus forming an infra-sutural crenate band. The interstices between the costae are spirally punctate. The punctations of the upper row are coarser than the rest. The small aperture is narrow. The columella descends rather obliquely. The peristome is simple. The base of the shell is marked with three revolving punctate grooves.

Distribution
This marine species occurs in the Red Sea, the Indian Ocean off Madagascar, Aldabra and the Mascarene Basin; also off the Andaman Islands and Fiji.

References

 Bratcher T. & Cernohorsky W.O. (1987). Living terebras of the world. A monograph of the recent Terebridae of the world. American Malacologists, Melbourne, Florida & Burlington, Massachusetts. 240pp
 Terryn, Y. (2007). Terebridae: A Collectors Guide. Conchbooks & Natural Art. 59pp + plates

External links

External links
 Hinds, R. B. (1844). Descriptions of new shells, collected during the voyage of the Sulphur, and in Mr. Cuming's late visit to the Philippines. Proceedings of the Zoological Society of London. (1844) 11: 149–168
 Preston H.B. (1908). Descriptions of new species of land, marine and freshwater shells from the Andaman Islands. Records of the Indian Museum. 2(2): 187-210, pls 14-17
 Fedosov, A. E.; Malcolm, G.; Terryn, Y.; Gorson, J.; Modica, M. V.; Holford, M.; Puillandre, N. (2020). Phylogenetic classification of the family Terebridae (Neogastropoda: Conoidea). Journal of Molluscan Studies.

Terebridae
Gastropods described in 1844